A military camp or bivouac is a semi-permanent military base, for the lodging of an army. Camps are erected when a military force travels away from a major installation or fort during training or operations, and often have the form of large campsites.

In the British Army, Commonwealth armies, the United States Marine Corps, and other military forces, permanent military bases are also called camps, including Tidworth Camp, Blandford Camp, Bulford Camp, and Devil's Tower Camp of the British Army; and Camp Lejeune and Camp Geiger of the United States Marine Corps.

Background
Historically, army camps referred to large field camps of military troops that could include several thousand people. In the Middle Ages, camp follower (i.e. wives, prostitutes , sutlers, laundresses, craftsmen, blacksmiths, squires, etc.) were also integrated into the camps. The composition varied, depending on whether it was a mercenary army with a few leaders, or large armies with many nobles and knights, such as those of the Crusades.

Leaguer

Leaguer and harbour are British terms for military camps; 'harbour' for temporary camps. The name, coming from 16th Century Dutch leger, was used for a military camp, particularly one laying siege.

During World War II leaguer was used in the Western Desert campaign particularly for camps of armoured formations. 
The arrangement of the leaguer depended on purpose and whether day or night. By day dispersed for protection against air attack with elements of the formation able to cover each other, at night ("close leaguer") the tank regiment forming a square or triangle, the tanks facing out with the support vehicles drawn up in the middle (but moving out of the leaguer and to the rear just before dawn).

Other uses
The term "bivouac" also has non-military uses.

Gallery

See also

 Bivouac shelter
 Cantonment
 Castra
 Force Provider
 Wagon fort
 Wagluhe

Bibliography

References

External links
 Modular Military Camps
 Modular Military Camps

Military camps
Military locations